The Azerbaijan National Democrat Party, formerly known as the Grey Wolves Party, is a political party in Azerbaijan. It is the branch of the Grey Wolves in Azerbaijan. Isgandar Hamidov, a party member, was the Minister of Internal Affairs of Azerbaijan of the Azerbaijan Popular Front Party government. The party was banned in 1995 and Hamidov imprisoned; however, the party is again functioning today with Hamidov as the party leader. The party is known for its fiery nationalist rhetoric and favoring a military solution to Nagorno-Karabakh conflict.

References

Azerbaijani nationalism
Nationalist parties in Azerbaijan
Formerly banned far-right parties
Grey Wolves (organization)
Nationalist parties in Asia
Nationalist parties in Europe
Pan-Turkist organizations
Political parties in Azerbaijan
Political parties with year of establishment missing